Marvyn Cox (born 11 July 1964 in Whitstable, Kent) is a former Speedway rider . Cox was twice a winner of the German Individual Championship in 1993 and 1995, when he raced under a German licence.

Domestic career
In 1984 he was signed by Oxford Cheetahs who bought him from Rye House Rockets for £15,000. The Oxford team had returned to the British League and the other signings to start as the top five riders for the season were Hans Nielsen for a record £30,000, Simon Wigg for £25,000, Melvyn Taylor for £12,000 and Jens Rasmussen, with Ian Clark and Nigel Sparshott at 6 & 7. After a mid table finish in 1984 he was part of the Oxford team that won the league and cup double during a 1985 British League season. They repeated the league and cup double the following season during the 1986 British League season and later won a third title during the 1989 British League season.

Overseas career
Marvyn rode in the Swedish Elitserien for Valsarna.

International career
In 1984 he won the European Under 21 Championship after finishing third in 1983. He has represented England in the World Team Cup final twice and featured in two World Championship finals. He was also in the first two seasons of the Speedway Grand Prix series in 1995 and 1996.

World Final appearances

Individual World Championship
 1986 -  Chorzów, Silesian Stadium - 12th - 3pts
 1994 -  Vojens, Speedway Center - 6th - 9pts

World Team Cup
 1986 -  Bradford, Odsal Stadium (with Simon Wigg / Kelvin Tatum / Jeremy Doncaster / Chris Morton) - 3rd - 81pts (0)
 1987 -  Coventry, Brandon Stadium (with Kelvin Tatum / Jeremy Doncaster / Simon Wigg / Simon Cross)  - 2nd - 101pts (2)

Speedway Grand Prix results
 1995 Speedway Grand Prix- 12th - 54pts
 1996 Speedway Grand Prix- 18th - 15pts

World Longtrack Championship Finals
 1989 -  Marianske Lazne 16pts (10th)
 1990 -  Herxheim 23pts (6th)
 1991 -  Marianske Lazne 7pts (12th)
 1992 -  Pfarrkirchen 5pts (14th)
 1994 -  Marianske Lazne 0pts (18th)
 1995 -  Scheeßel 17pts (4th)

References

External links
 grasstrackgb

1964 births
Living people
British speedway riders
English motorcycle racers
Bradford Dukes riders
Hackney Hawks riders
Oxford Cheetahs riders
Poole Pirates riders
Rye House Rockets riders
People from Whitstable
Individual Speedway Long Track World Championship riders